The Piratas de Campeche (English: Campeche Pirates) are a professional baseball team in the Mexican League (LMB) based in Campeche, Campeche, Mexico.

History
In 1980, the Alacranes de Durango moved to Campeche, and played their home games at Venustiano Carranza Park. Their first season was incomplete as the result of a strike carried out by the league's players. It would not take long for the franchise to find success. In 1981, they finished with a 71–50 record, good for second place in the Zona Sur, and beat the Tigres Capitalinos, 4–1, in the first round before falling to the Diablos Rojos del México in seven games.

In 1983, under player-manager Francisco Estrada, the team achieved its first league title. It won the intra-zone round-robin postseason tournament with a 13–5 record and beat the Indios de Ciudad Juárez in seven games. The team made the playoffs again in 1986. In 1989 and 1990, they reached the zone finals, but lost. Several times in the 1990s, the Piratas made the playoffs and lost in the first round.

Between 1998 and 2000, the Piratas played at Leandro Domínguez Park while their normal venue was renovated; the team returned to the renamed and rebuilt Estadio Nelson Barrera in 2001.

Francisco Estrada returned to manage the Piratas to their second title in 2004, finishing second in their zone with a 54–41 record and beating the Olmecas de Tabasco in five games, the Tigres in five, and the Diablos Rojos in seven; they won the LMB championship by defeating the Saraperos de Saltillo in five games. Estrada's number was the first ever retired by the franchise.

Roster

Retired numbers

References

External links
  

Baseball teams in Mexico
Sports teams in Campeche
Mexican League teams
Baseball teams established in 1980
1980 establishments in Mexico